Giulio Claro or Clarus (1525–1575) was an Italian Renaissance jurist and public official.

Biography 
Giulio Claro was born in Alessandria and took up the study of law in Pavia as early as 1536. After receiving a doctorate in 1550, Claro was appointed a Milanese Senator by Philip II in 1536, a royal pretor in Cremona in 1560/61, president of the Milanese Magistrato straordinario delle entrate in 1563 and regent of the Consejo d'Italia in Madrid in 1565.

Claro's work, together with that of Deciani and Farinacci, provided the theoretical foundation for the common criminal law of Europe. That common law held sway until it was attacked by Enlightenment legal critics such as Feuerbach and replaced by national penal codes in the 19th century. Claro's principal work is the Liber V. Sententiarum, the fifth volume of his legal encyclopedia Sententia receptae. Dedicated to criminal law, it was reprinted as part of the Julii Clari Opera omnia as late as 1737.

Editions

References

External links
 

1525 births
1575 deaths
16th-century Italian jurists